Blackney is a surname. Notable people with the surname include:

Gary Blackney (born 1944), American football player and coach
Ron Blackney (1933–2008), Australian middle distance runner
William W. Blackney (1876–1963), American politician

See also
Blackley (surname)
Blakney